Réginald David Savage (born May 1, 1970) is a Canadian former professional ice hockey player.

Biography
As a youth, Savage played in the 1982 Quebec International Pee-Wee Hockey Tournament with a minor ice hockey team from Saint-Hubert, Quebec.

Savage represented Canada at the 1989 World Junior Ice Hockey Championships. Drafted in 1988 by the Capitals, Savage also later played for the Quebec Nordiques. Savage was a member of the Washington Capitals when he scored against Minnesota North Stars goaltender Jon Casey on November 18, 1992 at the Capital Centre in Landover, Maryland.

Savage is notable as one of only five NHL players to score his first career goal on a penalty shot.

Since retiring from hockey, Savage works in California for Marriott Hotels & Resorts in security.

Career statistics

Regular season and playoffs

International

References

External links

1970 births
Anglophone Quebec people
Atlanta Knights players
Baltimore Skipjacks players
Black Canadian ice hockey players
Canadian ice hockey right wingers
Cornwall Aces players
Kansas City Blades players
Milwaukee Admirals players
Living people
National Hockey League first-round draft picks
Orlando Solar Bears (IHL) players
Quebec Nordiques players
San Antonio Dragons players
Syracuse Crunch players
Springfield Falcons players
Victoriaville Tigres players
Washington Capitals draft picks
Washington Capitals players
Ice hockey people from Montreal